Mimosa quadrivalvis, known as fourvalve mimosa, sensitive briar and cat's claw, is a trailing vine native to North America, Central America, and the Caribbean. It is known as sensitive briar because the leaves fold when they are touched or disturbed.

Description
It is a sprawling, herbaceous plant with alternate leaves. Each leaf is compound with up to 16 pairs of leaflets that fold together when touched. The stem is covered with small recurved prickles. The fruits are also prickly. Flowering occurs from May through September.

Distribution and habitat
Mimosa quadrivalvis occurs in the central and southern United States and south to Ecuador, as well as parts of the Caribbean, such as Puerto Rico.

Its habitat includes glades, open woods, thickets, prairies, and roadsides.

References

quadrivalvis
Flora of the United States